Black Box Recorder were an English indie rock band. They debuted in 1998 with England Made Me and followed this up with The Facts of Life, which gave them their first hit with the single of the same name in April 2000. Their third album, Passionoia, was released in 2003. There is also a compilation album, The Worst of Black Box Recorder, a collection of B-sides, cover versions and remixes. 

Black Box Recorder consisted of Sarah Nixey, Luke Haines (of The Auteurs), and John Moore (formerly of The Jesus and Mary Chain). Moore and Nixey married in 2001, and had one child. They divorced in 2006. 

Although no official announcement of the band's split was made, Black Box Recorder were on hiatus during the mid 2000s. The band collaborated with Art Brut during 2007, and released the single "Christmas Number One" under the name The Black Arts. In October 2008 the band played live at the Nick Sanderson tribute concert at the London Forum.

In late 2008 it was announced the band would be playing a gig at The Luminaire on 18 February 2009. The gig quickly sold out, and a second appearance at the same venue announced. These sold out shows were the band's first headlining appearances in five years.

Although an album was planned for 2009, the record was never released. On 16 April 2010, the band announced it would formally split after releasing a final single, "Keep It in the Family" b/w "Do You Believe in God?" on 6 May 2010.

Discography

Studio albums

Compilation albums

Singles

References

External links
Sarah Nixey's official website
John Moore's official website / blog
Luke Haines' official website

English rock music groups
English indie rock groups
Musical groups established in 1998
Musical groups disestablished in 2010
British musical trios
Luke Haines
1998 establishments in England